Los Pintores Argentinos en LRA Radio Nacional (1959) was a touring art exhibition organized by LRA Radio Nacional, the Argentine national radio station.   

This event took place in the context of a national effort to revitalize and promote Argentine art, which originated after the downfall of Juan Perón. It was one in many initiatives emerging from both the public and private sectors seeking "to promote an identity for Argentine art, to situate it in the world, and to secure its long-anticipated recognition" after a decade-long period of isolation from the world scene resulting from Perón's nationalist policies.  

The premise of this show was to showcase a collection of thirty modern-figurative paintings by notable artists such as Antonio Berni, Raul Soldi, Juan del Prete, Carlos Alonso, Norah Borges that had been featured in the cover of the radio station's program magazine between 1957 and 1959.  

The show traveled to seven Argentine provinces where the station had transmission points—Mendoza, Cordoba, Salta, Formosa, Buenos Aires and La Pampa—and was inaugurated on July 22, 1959 at the Mendoza office.

References 

Argentine art